Mojo Alcantara (Sicilian: Moju d'Alcàntara) is a comune (municipality) in the Metropolitan City of Messina in the Italian region Sicily, located about  east of Palermo and about  southwest of Messina.

Mojo Alcantara borders the following municipalities: Castiglione di Sicilia, Malvagna, Roccella Valdemone. It takes its name from the Alcantara river, flowing nearby, and the Monte Mojo, a side volcanic cone of Mount Etna.

References

External links
 Official website

Cities and towns in Sicily